Sujono Hadinoto (EVO: Soejono Hadinoto; 28 June 1915 –  29 December 1977) was an Indonesian politician, lawyer, and academician. Born in Blora Regency, he studied law in the Rechts Hogeschool. After graduating, he became active in the Indonesian independence movement. During the Indonesian National Revolution, Sujono became a member of the Indonesian National Party, later serving as party chairman from 1947 until 1950. Following the recognition of Indonesian sovereignty in 1949, he served as Minister of Economic Affairs in the Soekiman Cabinet. He later became dean of the Faculty of Law of the University of Indonesia. In 1964, he was appointed to the Supreme Advisory Council by Sukarno, and in 1966, he was appointed Ambassador of Indonesia to Hungary. He served as ambassador until 1970. He died on 29 December 1977 in Jakarta, and was buried in Bogor.

Early life and career 

Sujono Hadinoto was born on 8 June 1915, in Blora, Central Java, in what was then the Dutch East Indies (now Indonesia). He began his education at a Hollandsch-Inlandsche School and a Hogere Burgerschool, before advancing to the Rechts Hogeschool in Batavia, graduating in 1942. Sujono was also active in a number of nationalist youth organizations prior to the proclamation of Indonesian independence. During the Dutch colonial period, he worked as a superintendent at a company owned by the Mangkunegaran, before opening a law practice. He then worked for the Yogyakarta Sultanate as a head of a department.

Political career 

Sometime in before January 1946, Sujono founded the People's Sovereignty Party (Partai Kedaulatan Rakyat) in Yogyakarta, which merged with a number of other parties to form the Indonesian National Party following a conference at Kediri in late January 1946. In early November 1947, Sujono was appointed as chairman of the Indonesian National Party. Sujono later became a member of the Indonesian delegation in the 1949 Dutch–Indonesian Round Table Conference. He joined the People's Representative Council of the United States of Indonesia, representing the Republic of Indonesia.

In 1949, Sujono wrote a booklet, Dari Ekonomi Kolonial ke Ekonomi Nasional ("From a Colonial to a National Economy"), which espoused a transition from a Dutch-controlled economy to an Indonesian one. The booklet's title became a common phrase throughout the 1950s. He resigned from his office on 16 July 1951 due to health reasons, and was replaced by Wilopo. In conversations with American diplomats, Sujono indicated that he was against the nationalization of foreign petroleum companies operating in Indonesia. In 1950, he also joined the Indonesian delegation led by Lambertus Nicodemus Palar to Moscow to establish relations with the Soviet Union.

Sujono later became a professor and then dean at the Faculty of Law, University of Indonesia. He joined the Supreme Advisory Council in 1964, as its vice-chairman. He became the Ambassador to Hungary from 12 October 1966 until 4 April 1970.

He died on 29 December 1977 at Dr. Cipto Mangunkusumo Hospital in Jakarta. He was buried the following day in Bogor, West Java.

References

Bibliography

1915 births
1977 deaths
Government ministers of Indonesia
Indonesian National Party politicians
People from Blora Regency
Academic staff of the University of Indonesia
Members of the People's Representative Council, 1950
Ambassadors of Indonesia to Hungary